Bolton Interchange  is a bus station in the town of Bolton, in Greater Manchester. It is run by Transport for Greater Manchester.

Future

In January 2010, Transport for Greater Manchester (then the GMPTE) started a public consultation about the development of a bus station on Newport Street, replacing the bus station on Moor Lane and the small bus interchange at the railway station.

Plans for the bus station, designed by architects Aedas were submitted to Bolton Metropolitan Borough Council in April 2010 and were approved in June 2010. The plans were amended and a second consultation took place between October and December 2010. Approval for construction was granted in March 2012. The new station opened on 3 September 2017.

Services
The majority of services that serve Bolton bus station are run by Diamond Bus North West.  Other operators include Arriva North West, Blackburn Bus Company, Rosso, First Manchester , Stagecoach Manchester and Stagecoach in Lancashire.

There are frequent buses running to Bury, Chorley, Leigh, Manchester Piccadilly, Manchester Shudehill, Preston, Radcliffe, Rochdale and Wigan, plus several parts of the Bolton area, such as Breightmet, Deane, Harwood, Farnworth, Great Lever, Harwood and Horwich. Buses also run to Blackburn, Darwen, Rawtenstall and the Trafford Centre.

References

External links
Bolton Bus Station Departures – Transport for Greater Manchester

Bus stations in Greater Manchester
Buildings and structures in Bolton
Transport in the Metropolitan Borough of Bolton